Moorala Marwada is a Sufi folk singer from the Janana village of the Kutch District, Gujarat, India. Marwada hails from a long line of Meghwal singers of the village in Gujarat's Kutch district. He sings the poetry of Kabir, Mirabai, Ravidas and others. Mooralala sings in the Kaafi form of music that has evolved and been adopted by the Hindu singers of Shah Abdul Latif Bhittai. He has also been featured in the Kabir Project. He features in Gujarati Film Hellaro as a singer

References

21st-century Indian male classical singers
Living people
People from Kutch district
Year of birth missing (living people)
Musicians from Gujarat
Gujarati music